Select-O-Hits is an American independent record label distributor of music based in Memphis, Tennessee, United States.  They have been in business for almost 60 years, and distribute artists that include Johnnie Taylor, Jimmy Buffett, Three 6 Mafia, Colt Ford, Diana Reyes, and The Texas Tenors.

Company history

The early years
Select-O-Hits, which is owned by Sam W. Phillips and John Phillips, was co-founded in 1960 by their father, Tom Phillips, and uncle, Sam Phillips, the founder of Sun Records.

Tom Phillips began his career in music as Jerry Lee Lewis' road manager for a number of years. He had invested all of his savings into an upcoming 1958 European tour when news of Lewis' marriage to his 13-year-old cousin hit the front pages. Lewis' career came to a sudden, although temporary, halt. The tour was cancelled, and Tom was broke. Sam helped by giving him a job in the Sun Records warehouse and allowing Tom to live with him while his family stayed behind in Mobile, Alabama. Eventually, Tom saved enough money to send for his family in 1960.

Tom was not satisfied with running the warehouse, so with the help of his wife, Lucille, he opened a small record store and one-stop that provided small, predominantly black-owned record stores with everything from phonograph needles to display racks.

1970s to 1990s
In the mid-1970s, Select-O-Hits began to concentrate more on distributing and less on retail and one-stops. The retail store closed in the mid-1980s, and the one-stop followed a few years later.

Select-O-Hits has formed a number of successful record labels, such as Avenue, Icehouse, SOH, Brutal Records, Basix Music, Blues Works and Prophet. In 1997 half of the company was sold to Malaco of Jackson, Mississippi.

Recent
In 2005, Select-O-Hits and Malaco acquired Atlanta International Records of Atlanta, Georgia.  While all genres of music are represented in the family of labels Select-O-Hits distributes, Rap, Blues, Soul and Gospel are still the largest portion of the business.

Today with sales staff in Memphis, New York, Sacramento, Miami, and Dallas, Select-O-Hits is one of the largest independent record distributors in the country, providing services for over 300 independent vendors to all key US music traditional "brick and mortar" retailers, as well as digital media sites such as iTunes and eMusic.

Select-O Latino
In 2007, Select-O-Hits began distributing Latin and regional Mexican music labels.

Since then, the Select-O Latino brand has grown to include multiple Latin Grammy-nominated artists such as Luis Enrique, Luz Rios, Diego Verdaguer, Los Invasores de Nuevo León, and Orestes Vilató.

Sampling of artists and labels distributed

Artists

 The Texas Tenors
 Colt Ford
 Dondria
 Pastor Troy
 BeBe & CeCe Winans
 Lee DeWyze
 Jimmy Buffett
 Bret Michaels
 Three 6 Mafia
 Brantley Gilbert
 Miguelito
 Chris Isaak
 Don Cheto
 Joan Jett
 Lega-C
 8Ball & MJG
 Jencarlos Canela
 Diana Reyes
 Diego Verdaguer
 Ann-Margret
 Light Crust Doughboys
 James Blackwood
 The Jordanaires
 Bobby Jones
 Nokie Edwards
 Lil Wyte
 Jawga Boyz
 King Lil G
 Ryan Upchurch

Labels
 Malaco Records
 Sun Records
 Stax Records
 Mailboat Records
 Blackheart Records
 Prophet Entertainment
 Art Greenhaw Records

References

External links

Video :Light Crust Doughboys/Art Greenhaw Chronicles Vol. 1 @ YouTube
James Blackwood & the Light Crust Doughboys Years: GospelL Texas-Style @ YouTube

Record label distributors
Companies based in Memphis, Tennessee